I'm Ill (Hangul: 난 예술이야; RR: nan yesul-iya) is the fifth extended play by South Korean girl group Hello Venus. It was released on July 22, 2015, by Fantagio Music and distributed by NHN Entertainment. A song with the same name was used as the title track.

The EP was a commercial success peaking at number 7 on the Gaon Album Chart. It has sold over 4,300 physical copies as of August 2015.

Release
The EP was digitally released on July 22, 2015, through several music portals, including MelOn in South Korea, and iTunes for the global market.

Promotion

Live performances 
The group held their first comeback stage on MBC Music's Show Champion on July 22, 2015, performing the title track. They continued on Mnet's M Countdown on July 23.

Single 
"I'm Ill" was released as the title track in conjunction with the EP on July 22. The first music video teaser was released on July 20, 2015. A performance version of the music video was released on July 22, meanwhile the official music video was released on July 26.

Commercial performance 
I'm Ill debuted at number 7 on the Gaon Album Chart, on the chart issue dated July 26 - August 8, 2015. In its second week, the EP fell to number 13. The EP entered at number 19 on the chart, for the month of July 2015, with 3,379 physical copies sold. For the month of August, the EP placed at number 44 with additional 959 copies sold.

Track listing
Digital download

Charts

Release history

References

2015 EPs
Dance-pop EPs
Korean-language EPs
Hello Venus albums